Jai Bhadra Singh is an Indian politician.  He was elected to the Lok Sabha, the lower house of the Parliament of India from the Sultanpur, Uttar Pradesh as a member of the Bahujan Samaj Party.

References

External links
 Official biographical sketch in Parliament of India website

1953 births
Living people
India MPs 1999–2004
Lok Sabha members from Uttar Pradesh
Bahujan Samaj Party politicians